Lac-Sainte-Thérèse is a dispersed rural community in geographic Casgrain Township, Cochrane District in Northeastern Ontario, Canada. The community is counted as part of Unorganized Cochrane North Part in Canadian census data.

Location
It is on the eponymous Lac Ste. Thérèse (lake) and Ste.-Thérèse Creek, which flow via the Pivabiska River, Missinaibi River and Moose River to James Bay.

Noted people
 Doric Germain, Franco-Ontarian writer and professor, was born in Lac-Sainte-Thérèse.

References

Other map sources:

Communities in Cochrane District
Local services boards in Ontario